The Bernina Range is a mountain range in the Alps of eastern Switzerland and northern Italy. It is considered to be part of the Rhaetian Alps within the Central Eastern Alps. It is one of the highest ranges of the Alps, covered with many glaciers. Piz Bernina, its highest peak, is the most easterly four-thousand-metre peak in the Alps. The peak in the range which sees the most ascents is Piz Palü.

The Bernina Range is separated from the Albula Range in the north-west by the Maloja Pass and the Upper Engadin valley; from the Livigno Range in the east by the Bernina Pass; from the Bergamo Alps in the south by the Adda valley (Valtellina); and from the Bregaglia Range in the south-west by the Muretto Pass. The Bernina Range is drained by the rivers Adda, Inn and
Maira (Mera in Italy).

The term Bernina Alps can also be used in an extended sense to include both the Bernina and Bregaglia ranges; this is the area coloured red on the map (right) and labelled 'Bernina Alpen'.

Peaks

The main peaks of the Bernina Range are:

Glaciers
Main glaciers :

Morteratsch Glacier
Roseg Glacier
Tschierva Glacier
Palü Glacier
Scerscen Superiore Glacier
Scerscen Inferiore Glacier
Fellaria Glacier

Passes
The main passes of the Bernina Range are:

Mountain huts
There are several manned and unmanned mountain huts in the Bernina Range.

See also
Swiss Alps

References
Swisstopo

External links

 Visual day-by-day narrative & photoblog of the Tour of the Bernina hiking trail around the Bernina range

 
Mountain ranges of the Alps
Rhaetian Alps
Mountain ranges of Italy
Mountain ranges of Graubünden
Engadin
Limestone Alps